The Western Harbour Tunnel & Beaches Link is a planned underground motorway scheme in Sydney, New South Wales. It consists of a series of motorway tunnels running north-south between Burnt Bridge Creek Deviation (A8) at Balgowlah and the WestConnex at Rozelle Interchange, providing direct access from the Northern Beaches to the Inner West at Rozelle The six-lane motorway is planned to be approximately 18 km long and to be built with both State and Federal funding.

Major construction of the Warringah Freeway upgrade and the 6.5 km Western Harbour Tunnel began in late 2021 and 2022 respectively, with an expected completion in 2027–28. The 2021-22 NSW Budget allocated $6.3 billion to the project, with a contract for the second stage of tunnelling works awarded in December 2022 for $4.2 billion.

In June 2022, the NSW Government announced that the Beaches Link section of the project would be shelved indefinitely, due to market constraints and labour shortages.

Components
The scheme (from south to north) consists of:
Western Harbour Tunnel and Warringah Freeway Upgrade (under construction; expected completion in 2027–28)
Western Harbour Tunnel (6.5 km) – Warringah Freeway to Rozelle Interchange
Warringah Freeway Upgrade (4 km) – upgrade of the Warringah Freeway

Beaches Link and Gore Hill Freeway Connection (shelved indefinitely; previously expected completion in 2027–28)
Beaches Link (7.2 km) – Burnt Bridge Creek Deviation (A8) and Wakehurst Parkway to Warringah Freeway, and upgrade of Wakehurst Parkway 
Gore Hill Freeway Connection (2 km) – Beaches Link to Gore Hill Freeway, and upgrade of the Gore Hill Freeway 

The Beaches Link and the Western Harbour Tunnel will be built as tunnels with 3 lanes each direction, with the exception of the 2.5 km branch between Beaches Link and Wakehurst Parkway which will be two lanes per direction. The Gore Hill Freeway Connection will also be two lanes each direction.

Alignment

Beaches Link
The Beaches Link consist of two branches, the main branch starting from Burnt Bridge Creek Deviation at Balgowlah and the second branch starting from Wakehurst Parkway at Seaforth. Both branches join in Seaforth, and the tunnel crosses Middle Harbour to Northbridge to the west of the current main crossing, the Spit Bridge. From Northbridge, it will connect with Gore Hill Freeway and Warringah Freeway in its southern end.

A new connection road will be built at Balgowlah linking between Burnt Bridge Creek Deviation, the Beaches Link tunnel entrance and exit, and Sydney Road. The road will divide the former Balgowlah Golf Club grounds.

Western Harbour Tunnel
The Western Harbour Tunnel will start at Warringah Freeway at Cammeray in the north, joining up with the southern end of Beaches Link. The tunnel crosses Sydney Harbour between Balls Head and Birchgrove, and ends at the Rozelle Interchange in the south, with connections to City West Link and the M4–M5 tunnels towards the M4 and M8 motorways.

History

Planning and Construction
The Western Harbour Tunnel & Beaches Link is aimed at reducing the level of traffic congestion in the greater Sydney area. The Sydney Harbour Bridge and Sydney Harbour Tunnel corridor currently carry 80 percent of all vehicles crossing Sydney Harbour and the Parramatta River, greatly increasing traffic congestion. The Government of New South Wales has pledged $77 million in funding to evaluate the design and construction feasibility of the project. The design phase began in early April 2017 and is scheduled to be completed by mid-2018.

The Beaches Link section follows similarly to abandoned extensions of the Warringah Freeway in the 1960s and 1970s and bypasses the heavily congested Spit Bridge.

Community engagement and the environment assessment for both components were undertaken during 2020 and 2021. The Western Harbour Tunnel received planning approval in January 2021. 

Early work activities commenced in March 2021, while major construction of the Warringah Freeway upgrade and the Western Harbour Tunnel began in late 2021 and 2022 respectively.

In June 2022, the NSW Government announced that the Beaches Link section of the project would be shelved indefinitely, due to market constraints and labour shortages.

Tenders
In December 2020, the NSW Government announced a shortlist of a potential Development Partner to assist with the procurement and delivery of the Western Harbour Tunnel project. The potential Development Partner will not be managing the financing of the project. The shortlist is:
Bechtel Infrastructure
Harbour West Partners, a consortium comprising Macquarie Capital, Jacobs and RPS
Laing O'Rourke

The announcement of the potential Development Partner was expected to be made in 2021. It was reported in September 2021 that a search for the Development Partner had been quietly scrapped.

In the same month, separate to the Development Partner project, the design and construction contract for the Warringah Freeway upgrade was awarded to CPB Contractors and Downer EDI. The tunnelling contract for the first stage of the Western Harbour Tunnel between Rozelle and Birchgrove was awarded to the John Holland CPB joint venture on 19 January 2022. The joint venture was already constructing the Rozelle Interchange as part of WestConnex, which the Western Harbour Tunnel would be connected to. On the same day, a shortlist for the second tunnelling stage of the Western Harbour Tunnel was announced:
Acciona
Bouygues & Vinci joint venture
John Holland, CPB and UGL Engineering joint venture
The $4.2 billion stage 2 contract was awarded to Acciona in December 2022, with this stage expected to commence work in 2023 and last for five years.

Western Harbour Tunnel construction 
Construction on the first stage of the Western Harbour Tunnel began in mid-2022, which included 1.7 km of tunnel excavation at the project's southern end. Construction on stage 2, which includes the use of Tunnel Boring Machines under Sydney Harbour, is expected to commence in 2023.

In November 2022 it was reported that the government had changed the planned construction method for the harbour tunnel component. The government abandoned plans to use immersed tube construction, instead opting for deeper tunnels using Tunnel Boring Machines.

Cost
In 2017 the forecast cost for both the Western Harbour Tunnel and Beaches Link was 14 billion. Both freeways will be tolled.

The 2021-22 NSW Budget allocated $6.3 billion for the Western Harbour Tunnel. The Warringah Freeway upgrade contract was awarded at a cost of $1.18 billion.

Operations and maintenance
In April 2022, the state government signed a 15-year contract with Ventia for the asset management, operations and maintenance of the Sydney Harbour Tunnel and the future Western Harbour Tunnel. Tolling arrangements of both tunnels were unrelated to the new agreement.

References

External links
Western Harbour Tunnel and Beaches Link - Project Information - Transport for NSW
Western Harbour Tunnel interactive portal - Transport for NSW
Beaches Link interactive portal - Transport for NSW

Highways in Sydney
Proposed roads in Australia